The Emilio Caraffa Provincial Fine Arts Museum is an art museum in Córdoba, Argentina.

Overview

The institution was established as the Provincial Fine Arts Museum by the Province of Córdoba. In 1915, the museum's design was commissioned to German Argentine architect Juan Kronfuss. Built on the western edge of the newly inaugurated Sarmiento Park, the work of Neoclassical architecture was completed in 1916, and originally included 255 m² (2,700 ft²) and one exhibit hall, the Kronfuss Salon. The Provincial Museum was renamed in honor of local artist Emilio Caraffa, in 1950, and new wings completed in 1962 and 2007 brought the museum's display area to 1,500 m² (17,000 ft²), distributed among nine exhibit halls.

Aside from its permanent collection, the museum maintains paintings and sculptures by other renowned local artists such as Juan Carlos Castagnino, Pablo Curatella Manes, Fernando Fader, Emilio Pettoruti, Lino Enea Spilimbergo, as well as lithographs by Pablo Picasso and paintings by Tsuguharu Foujita and Francisco Goya. The museum also hosts temporary exhibits and includes the provincial art archive and restoration workshop, as well as a library and educational facilities.

References and external links
Provincia de Córdoba: Museo Caraffa 

Art museums and galleries in Argentina
Buildings and structures in Córdoba, Argentina
Museums in Córdoba Province, Argentina
Art museums established in 1916
1916 establishments in Argentina